Penicillium soppii is a psychrotolerant species of fungus in the genus Penicillium which produces cycloaspeptide A.

References

Further reading 
 
 

soppii
Fungi described in 1927